Hancock County Airport , also known as Ron Lewis Field, is a public use airport located three nautical miles (6 km) northeast of the central business district of Lewisport, in Hancock County, Kentucky, United States. The airport opened in 2007 and it is owned by the Hancock County Airport Board.

Facilities
It has one asphalt paved runway designated 5/23 which measures 4,000 by 75 feet (1,219 x 23 m).

References

External links
 

Airports in Kentucky
Buildings and structures in Hancock County, Kentucky
2007 establishments in Kentucky